Avarampatti is a village in the Thanjavur taluk of Thanjavur district, Tamil Nadu.

Demographics 

As per the 2011 census, Avarampatti had a total population of 1414 with 709 males and 705 females. The sex ratio was 994. The literacy rate was 86.07%.

Geography
Avarampatti is located on the way between two middle level towns Budalur and Sengipatti.
It is 4 kilometers away from Budalur, which is connected through rail routes between Thanjavur and Tiruchirapalli.

Religion
Avarampaati is a Hindu dominated village; 90% of the population are Hindus and 10% Christians.
Prominent temples in Avarampatti are
Bhagavathi amman temple.
Pillaiyar kovil(Lord Ganesha temple)
Thayalnayaki Amman kovil

References 

 

Villages in Thanjavur district